Gift Nyakno Monday (born 9 December 2001) is a Nigerian professional footballer who plays as a striker for Spanish Liga F club UDG Tenerife and the Nigeria women's national team.

Club career 
In January 2021, Monday was named the league's Player of the Month for the second consecutive month. In March 2021, Monday scored a brace to lift FC Robo to a 2–1 win over the undefeated Rivers Angels.
Gift Monday inspired Bayelsa Queens to winning the 2021–22 league title and also finished the season's topscorer.

International career
Monday competed at the 2018 FIFA U-20 Women's World Cup in France. In 2019, she captained the team to its first gold medal in 12 years at the African Games after defeating Cameroon to 3–1 win on penalties. In February 2021, Monday was named to the senior national team squad ahead of the 2021 Turkish Women's Cup. She was part of the team that won the championship and was the first African team to do so. She scored the eighth goal in the team's 9–0 win over Equatorial Guinea.

Honors
 Individual
 NWFL Premiership Player of the Month: December 2020, January 2021
NWFL Premiership Player of the Season: 2022

 International
 Turkish Women's Cup: 2021

References

External links
 

2001 births
Living people
People from Bayelsa State
Nigerian women's footballers
Women's association football forwards
FC Robo players
UD Granadilla Tenerife players
Nigeria women's international footballers
Nigerian expatriate women's footballers
Nigerian expatriate sportspeople in Spain
Expatriate women's footballers in Spain